New Pennington is an unincorporated community in Salt Creek Township, Decatur County, Indiana.

History
New Pennington was laid out in 1851. It was named for its founder, Eli Pennington.

A post office was established at New Pennington in 1852, and remained in operation until it was discontinued in 1886.

Geography

References

Unincorporated communities in Decatur County, Indiana
Unincorporated communities in Indiana